Gajendra Singh Sareen (born 7 Nov 1966) is a businessman of Indian origin and the founder, CEO and president of Singapore headquartered tire manufacturer and distributor Omni United Pte. Ltd. He founded Omni United in 2003 and has since received numerous entrepreneurship awards including "Distinguished Business Leader Award", "DBS Insignia Spirit of Vision Prestige Award"  and in 2012 was named to Fortune magazine's list of "Asia's Hottest People in Business". In 2014, he was featured in "The Peak" magazine's anniversary publication as one of 30 men and women documenting their success stories - the "30/30 – The Game Changers".

Early life 

Sareen was born in Madhya Pradesh a state in India in a middle-class family. He was the youngest at number 4 of three siblings, when his mother (Amrit Kaur Sareen, born 17 Feb 1938) was paralyzed after being involved in an accident while visiting Africa. His father (Dr Surender Singh Sareen, born 15 March 1933), a civil servant, encouraged him to always be independent, push his limits and chase his dreams.  His sister (Jayendra Kaur, born 26 August 1960) currently lives in Dubai, while his brother (Paremendra Singh Sareen, born 29 Nov 1961) died in a road accident in 1989 at the age of 27.

Education 

Sareen is an alumnus of Daly College Indore, Madhya Pradesh, India and holds a degree in Statistics from Bhopal University. He is also a decorated and distinguished member of the Indian Army. He joined the Indian Military Academy in 1986 and resigned his commission in 1992 to support his family. He was awarded a SENA MEDAL, a gallantry award for action, by the President of India during his tenure in the Army.

Personal life 

In 1994, four years after their marriage, Sareen and his wife Rewa Manmohan Singh Sareen (born 4 Feb 1968) made the decision to relocate to Singapore. In 2009, Sareen took up citizenship in Singapore before launching two tire businesses, including Mindtrac.com, and establishing Omni United in 2003. The couple now lives with their two sons, Hanut (born 22 Nov 1993) who will finish studying at Northeastern University in Boston in the Spring, and Sumer (born 22 Oct 1998) and Sareen's mother in their Bukit Timah home. His father died in 2005.

Prior to Omni United career information/details 

Omni United is Sareen's third business venture. Prior to its founding, he was an early entrepreneur in the online e-commerce industry. He launched, managed and subsequently sold mindtrac.com, one of the first B2B online market exchanges in the tire industry, backed by JP Morgan.  Sareen launched mindtrac.com having gained previous knowledge of the market through various trading ventures throughout Asia and the USA.

Omni United Pte. Ltd 

Under Sareen's direction, Omni United currently sells in excess of 6.5 million units of passenger and light truck tires in 50 countries. Omni United's manufacturing partners are located in the Indonesia, China, India and Thailand. The company currently sells more than two million units of passenger and light truck tires a year in the United States. Sareen purchased Interstate Tire Distributor (ITD), a California-based wholesaler with six locations in four Western states, in October, 2015. In June 2016, Sareen made his second acquisition in 9 months with the purchase of Texas-based A to Z Tire & Battery, Inc. That part of the business has since been renamed Omnisource.

Timberland Tires 

Introduced in November, 2014, Timberland Tires were born out of an idea between Sareen and global lifestyle brand Timberland. Timberland Tires is the first brand purposely designed and created with sustainability in mind.  The tires feature a rubber formulation that is appropriate for the recycling of the tires at the end of their useful life into outsoles for Timberland shoes.

Timberland Tires continues to receive recognition by some of the most influential organizations in the world when it comes to collaboration, innovation and sustainability. In May 2016, Timberland Tires won the WGSN Futures award in the category of Sustainable Design. Timberland Tires were also finalists of the 2016 Guardian Awards and also shortlisted as one of the finalists for the Institute for Scrap Recycling Industries (ISRI) 2016 Design for Recycling Award.

Commitment to sustainability - Radar Tires and Timberland Tires 

Sareen is highly committed to sustainable business practices. His vision to have all Omni United - Radar Tires products recycled at the end of their lifespans moved one step closer in October 2013 when flagship brand Radar Tires was certified Carbon Neutral. This accomplished a goal set over two years ago with Ernst & Young. This achievement is the result of a comprehensive twelve-month effort to measure the company's Radar Tires brands' global carbon footprint in accordance with certification standards. Omni United has achieved its goal of net zero carbon emissions through supporting wind energy projects, in Germany 

With his November 2014 launch of the Timberland Tires brand, Sareen announced a take back and recycling program to convert worn Timberland Tires into new outsoles of Timberland footwear. Liberty Tire Recycling will collect worn Timberland Tires after they have been changed out at authorized Timberland locations and sort the tires at its consolidation centers. From there, the used tires will be shipped to a North American tire recycling facility where they will be recycled into crumb rubber and further processed into sheet rubber for use in Timberland® footwear. The rubber will be mixed into an approved compound for outsoles that will ultimately be incorporated into Timberland® boots and shoes.

Partnership with The Breast Cancer Research Foundation 

Sareen is also an ambassador to The Breast Cancer Research Foundation, based in New York. In 2012, he launched a pink side wall tire designed specifically to support the campaign.
The pink side wall highlights the pink color of the fight again breast cancer. So far the company has donated over US$1.4 million, funding 28,000 hours of research to the cause.

Sports marketing programs

LPGA sponsorship  

In 2016, the company announced sponsorship of LPGA player Jodi Ewart Shadoff. As part of the agreement with Omni United, English-born Jodi Ewart Shadoff will wear the Radar Tires brand logo on her golf shirt and other apparel at all tournaments. Jodi continued to represent Radar Tires in the 2020 LPGA season.

Motorsports 

In 2013, Radar Tires entered into the off-road racing and motorsports world in the Lucas Oil Off Road Racing Series (LOORRS), SCORE International Desert Series and TORC: The Off Road Championship. In these series, the company participates in short-course off-road desert racing and long course desert racing. Radar's inaugural season featured the brand's Renegade R5 M/T tire. Radar Tires won the Class 10 at the SCORE International Baja 500.

Rewa Vineyards

The estate 

GS Sareen has always had a love for fine wines and it is his ingenuity and adventurism that led him to Napa Valley to fulfill his desire of owning a vineyard and producing wine. It was in 2012 that he acquired a vineyard in Coombsville AVA and named it after his wife, Rewa. The estate spans over 43 acres and is located in the providential rocky knoll in the volcanic hills of Coombsville which has a geologic history dating back 9 million years.

The wines 
Currently the Vineyard produces two wines from the Sauvignon Blanc grapes planted on the lower Eastern slopes where the temperature is a few degrees cooler and suited for this varietal and a 100% Cabernet Sauvignon from the western slopes which are more gradual and get maximum sun throughout the day. The first vintage of Sauvignon Blanc was 2017 and the first vintage of the Cabernet Sauvignon was 2015. Both varietals  have received great reviews from the critics and have been rated very high. In 2018 the team decided to plant some more grape varieties and Merlot and Malbec were planted. The 2020 vintage will be produced using some more varietals.

The team 

Celia Welch is recognized as one of the world's finest winemakers. She grew up in Oregon and first learned about wine from her father, a home winemaker and collector. She graduated from UC Davis with a degree in Enology and honed her skills in the Pacific Northwest, New Zealand and Australia before settling in Napa Valley. Rewa Vineyards represents a significant project from perhaps the best terroir in the budding Coombsville AVA.
 
Mike Wolf is a viticulturist who was raised just outside New York City and graduated from Alfred University with a bachelor's degree in history. He was first exposed to agriculture after moving to Ukiah in 1972 to help a friend manage his family farm. He moved to Napa Valley to supervise a large agricultural development in Pope Valley and then accepted a prestigious role with Beckstoffer Vineyards to manage their heralded vineyards, totalling over 500 acres. It was there that he became well respected by the valley's top winemakers, laying the groundwork for the launch of Mike Wolf Vineyard Management in 1997. Today, he farms 800 acres for premium wine companies in Napa Valley.

Awards and recognition 
Throughout his career as the founding President and CEO of Omni United, Sareen has received many awards and recognitions. Most recently he was felicitated by the Honourable Chief Minister of Madhya Pradesh, India, Mr. Chouhan Shivraj on behalf of the state Government for having done pioneering work in his professional field, his achievements and for his contribution to global economy. He is the recipient of the 2017, 2016 and 2015 Singapore Enterprise 50 awards, the 2015 Ethical Corporation's Sixth Annual Responsible Business Awards, 2013 Distinguished Business Leader Award, and the 2013 DBS Insignia Spirit of Vision Prestige Award. In 2012, he was named to Fortune Magazine's 2012 list of "Asia's Hottest People in Business". In 2014, he was featured in "The Peak" magazine's anniversary publication as one of 30 men and women documenting their success stories - the "30/30 – The Game Changers".

References 

Indian philanthropists
1966 births
Living people
Businesspeople of Indian descent
The Daly College Alumni